George Tsivadze (born 2 January 1993) is a Georgian tennis player.

Tsivadze has a career high ATP singles ranking of 733 achieved on 22 June 2015. He also has a career high ATP doubles ranking of 471 achieved on 14 August 2017. Tsivadze has won three ITF doubles titles.

Tsivadze has represented Georgia in the Davis Cup, where he has a W/L record of 17–21. Tsivadze won a remarkable Davis cup match against Finland, winning over Patrik Niklas-Salminen being down 5-2 40-15 in the fifth set and then returning to win 7-5 in the tiebreaker. The match was 5 hours and 49 minutes the longest Davis cup match in Georgia's history.

Future and Challenger finals

Doubles 20 (8–12)

External links
 
 
 

1993 births
Living people
Male tennis players from Georgia (country)
Sportspeople from Batumi